Jack Wallace may refer to:

 Jack Wallace (American football) (1925–1995), American football player and coach
 Jack Wallace (rugby union), English rugby union player
 Jack Wallace (catcher) (1890–1960), Major League Baseball catcher
 Jack Wallace (Negro leagues), American baseball player
 Jack Wallace (actor) (1933–2020), American actor known for his work in theater and film
 Jack Wallace (sailor), British Olympic sailor
 Jack Wallace (sledge hockey) (born 1998), American sledge hockey player

See also 
 John Wallace (disambiguation)